is a women's volleyball team based in Hitachinaka city, Ibaraki, Japan. It plays in V.League 1. The owner is Hitachi Automotive Systems.

History
It was founded in November 1980 as Hitachi Sawa Rivale.
It was promoted to the V.League in 1998.
In April 2009, it lost the V.challenge match, so it was demoted to the V.challenge League for the next season.
In April 2010, the team name was changed to Hitachi Rivale.
In April 2013, It was re-promoted to V. Premier League after beating Denso Airybees.

Honours
 V.Premier League
Runners-up (1): 2016

Kurowashiki All Japan Volleyball Championship
Runners-up (1): 2006

League results

Current squad
2021-2022 Squad as of 25 August - 2021 

 Head coach:  Asako Tajimi

Former players

Domestic Players
 
 Yuki Sugawara Tanaka (2006-2008)
 Akiko Ino (2005-2007)
 Keiko Kuroha (2005–2009)
 Megumi Itabashi (2003–2009)
 Mariko Futakawa (2007–2009)
 Ayano Inishi (2006–2009)
 Kaori Iida (1998–2009)
 Miki Shimada (2006–2009)
 Narumi Takashima (2007–2009)
 Saori Ishida (2007–2009)
 Makoto Matsuura (2009–2010)
 Sae Ishida (2008-2015)
 Akari Fujisaki (2007-2010)
 Yurie Yamamoto (2009-2010)
 Ai Yoshida (2008-2011)
 Airi Kawahara (2009-2011)
 Kaori Nakamura (2007-2011)
 Kotomi Tosaki (2008-2011)
 Midori Miyakozawa (2001–2006, 2011–2012)
 Asako Tajimi (2011–2012)
 Momoka Minami (2011–14)
 Yukiko Ebata (2007–14)
 Yukino Nagamatsu (2011–2014)
 Saori Takahashi (2011–2014)
 Marie Wada (2013–2015)
 Arisa Satō (2012–2018)
 Megumi Kurihara (2014–2018)
 Mami Uchiseto (2013–2017)
 Kana Shimohira (2016–2018)
 Kaori Mabashi  (2016-2019)  Transfer to Kurobe AquaFairies
 Moemi Toi  (2006-2019)
 Hisae Watanabe (ja) (2013–2020)
 Sakura Doi (2016–2020)
 Yuka Onodera (2015–2021)
 Uran Horii (2017–2021)
 Miyu Kubota (ja) (2017–2021)
 Maiha Haga (2015–2021)
 Miya Sato (2011–2021)

Foreign Players
 
 Laura Heyrman (2018-2019)
 
 Sidarka Núñez (2008–2009)
 
 Francien Huurman(2011–2012)
 
  Cursty Le Roux (2016-2018)
 Lauren Paolini (2013-2017)

References

External links 
 Official Website

Japanese volleyball teams
Volleyball clubs established in 1980
Sports teams in Ibaraki Prefecture
Hitachi